The 1984 NBA draft was the 37th annual draft of the National Basketball Association (NBA). It was held at the Felt Forum at Madison Square Garden in New York City, New York, on June 19, 1984, before the 1984–85 season. The draft is generally considered to be one of the greatest in NBA history, with four Hall of Famers being drafted in the first sixteen picks and five overall. It included first pick Akeem Olajuwon, Michael Jordan, Charles Barkley, and John Stockton. The draft was broadcast in the United States on the USA Network. In this draft, 23 NBA teams took turns selecting amateur U.S. college basketball players and other eligible players, including international players. The Houston Rockets won the coin flip and were awarded the first overall pick, while the Portland Trail Blazers, who obtained the Indiana Pacers' first-round pick in a trade, were awarded the second pick. The remaining first-round picks and the subsequent rounds were assigned to teams in reverse order of their win–loss record in the previous season. The Cleveland Cavaliers were awarded an extra first-round draft pick as compensation for the draft picks traded away by their previous owner, Ted Stepien. A player who had finished his four-year college eligibility was automatically eligible for selection. Before the draft, five college underclassmen announced that they would leave college early and would be eligible for selection. Prior to the draft, the San Diego Clippers relocated to Los Angeles and became the Los Angeles Clippers. The draft consisted of 10 rounds comprising the selection of 228 players. This draft was the last to be held before the creation of the draft lottery in 1985. It was also the first NBA draft to be overseen by David Stern, who would continue as the commissioner of the league for the following 30 years.

Draft selections

Notable secondary picks

Trades involving draft picks

Draft-day trades
The following trades involving drafted players were made on the day of the draft.
 In a three-team trade, Cleveland acquired the draft rights to sixth pick Melvin Turpin from Washington, Washington acquired Cliff Robinson from Cleveland and Gus Williams from Seattle, and Seattle acquired Ricky Sobers from Washington and the draft rights to 12th pick Tim McCormick from Cleveland.
 Washington acquired the draft rights to 22nd pick Tom Sewell from Philadelphia in exchange for a 1988 first-round pick.
 The L.A. Clippers acquired the draft rights to 31st pick Jay Murphy from Golden State in exchange for Jerome Whitehead.

Pre-draft trades
Prior to the day of the draft, the following trades were made and resulted in exchanges of picks between the teams.
 On June 5, 1981, Portland acquired a first-round pick from Indiana in exchange for Tom Owens. Portland used the pick to draft Sam Bowie.
 On September 16, 1980, Dallas acquired a first-round pick from Cleveland in exchange for Mike Bratz. Dallas used the pick to draft Sam Perkins.
 On October 12, 1978, Philadelphia acquired a first-round pick from the L.A. Clippers (as San Diego) in exchange for World B. Free. Philadelphia used the pick to draft Charles Barkley.
 On August 28, 1980, the L.A. Clippers (as San Diego) acquired Phil Smith and a first-round pick from Golden State in exchange for World B. Free. The L.A. Clippers used the pick to draft Lancaster Gordon.
 On August 16, 1978, Philadelphia acquired Bobby Jones, Ralph Simpson and a first-round pick from Denver in exchange for George McGinnis and a 1978 first-round pick. Philadelphia used the pick to draft Leon Wood.
 On August 18, 1983, the L.A. Clippers (as San Diego) acquired James Donaldson, Greg Kelser, Mark Radford, a first-round pick and a 1985 second-round pick from Seattle in exchange for Tom Chambers, Al Wood, a third-round pick and a 1987 second-round pick. The L.A. Clippers used the pick to draft Michael Cage.
 On September 17, 1983, Indiana acquired Vince Taylor and a first-round pick from New York in a three-team trade with New York and Kansas City. Indiana used the pick to draft Vern Fleming.
 On August 18, 1983, Portland acquired a second-round pick from Indiana in exchange for Granville Waiters. Previously, Indiana acquired the draft rights to Sidney Lowe and the pick on June 28, 1983 from Chicago in exchange for the draft rights to Mitchell Wiggins. Portland used the pick to draft Victor Fleming.
 On October 5, 1982, Seattle acquired a second-round pick from Houston in exchange for Wally Walker. Seattle used the pick to draft Cory Blackwell.
 On February 15, 1983, Indiana acquired Russ Schoene a second-round pick and a 1983 first-round pick from Philadelphia in exchange for Clemon Johnson and a third-round pick. Previously, Philadelphia acquired the pick and a 1983 fourth-round pick on October 27, 1982, from the L.A. Clippers (as San Diego) in exchange for Lionel Hollins. Indiana used the pick to draft Stuart Gray.
 On October 19, 1981, Golden State acquired 1982 and 1984 second-round picks from Washington in exchange for John Lucas. Golden State used the pick to draft Steve Burtt.
 On February 10, 1983, Detroit a second-round pick and a 1985 third-round pick from San Antonio in exchange for Edgar Jones. Detroit used the pick to draft Eric Turner.
 On August 15, 1980, Portland acquired a second-round pick and a 1983 first-round pick from Denver in exchange for T. R. Dunn and a 1983 first-round pick. Portland used the pick to draft Steve Colter.
 On July 5, 1983, Washington acquired Tom McMillen and a second-round pick from Atlanta in exchange for Randy Wittman. Previously, Atlanta acquired the pick and a 1985 second-round pick on February 13, 1983, from Detroit in a three-team trade with Detroit and Seattle. Previously, Detroit acquired the pick and a 1982 second-round pick on August 26, 1981, from Kansas City in exchange for Larry Drew. Washington used the pick to draft Tony Costner.
 On February 15, 1983, Golden State acquired a second-round pick from Atlanta in exchange for Rickey Brown. Golden State used the pick to draft Othell Wilson.
 On June 28, 1983, Chicago acquired the draft rights to Ennis Whatley, the draft rights to Chris McNealy and a second-round pick from Kansas City in exchange for Mark Olberding and the draft rights to Larry Micheaux. Previously, Kansas City acquired the pick on June 30, 1982, from Atlanta in exchange for the draft rights to Jim Johnstone. Previously, Atlanta acquired the pick and a 1983 second-round pick on December 2, 1980, from Seattle in exchange for Armond Hill. Chicago used the pick to draft Ben Coleman.
 On November 25, 1981, Seattle acquired Ray Tolbert and a second-round pick from New Jersey in exchange for James Bailey. Seattle used the pick to draft Danny Young.
 On September 11, 1980, Dallas acquired a second-round pick and a 1983 second-round pick from Utah in exchange for Billy McKinney. Dallas used the pick to draft Anthony Teachey.
 On August 12, 1983, Dallas acquired Foots Walker, a second-round pick and a 1985 first-round pick from New Jersey in exchange for Kelvin Ransey. Previously, New Jersey acquired the second-round pick on June 22, 1983 from New York in exchange for Len Elmore. Dallas used the pick to draft Tom Sluby.
 On June 7, 1984, Denver acquired Wayne Cooper, Lafayette Lever, Calvin Natt, a second-round pick and a 1985 first-round pick from Portland in exchange for Kiki Vandeweghe. Denver used the pick to draft Willie White.
 On February 15, 1984, Chicago acquired Steve Johnson, a second-round pick and two 1985 second-round picks from Kansas City in exchange for Reggie Theus. Previously, Kansas City acquired Billy Knight and the pick on September 17, 1983 from Indiana in a three-team trade with Indiana and New York. Previously, Indiana acquired the pick on September 22, 1982 from Detroit in exchange for Tom Owens. Chicago used the pick to draft Greg Wiltjer.
 On September 30, 1983, Washington acquired a second-round pick from Milwaukee in exchange for Kevin Grevey. Washington used the pick to draft Fred Reynolds.
 On November 12, 1983, Golden State acquired a second-round pick from Philadelphia in exchange for Sam Williams. Golden State used the pick to draft Gary Plummer.
 On October 8, 1980, Portland acquired a second-round pick from the L.A. Lakers in exchange for Jim Brewer. Portland used the pick to draft Jerome Kersey.
 On January 21, 1984, San Antonio acquired a third-round pick from Denver in exchange for Keith Edmonson. San Antonio used the pick to draft Joe Binion.
 On March 8, 1984, San Antonio acquired a fourth-round pick from Milwaukee as compensation for the signing of Mike Dunleavy as a free agent. San Antonio used the pick to draft Ozell Jones.
 On October 5, 1983, Milwaukee acquired a sixth-round pick from Houston as compensation for the signing of Phil Ford as a free agent. Milwaukee used the pick to draft McKinley Singleton.

Legacy
The Houston Rockets used their first pick to draft Akeem Olajuwon, a junior center from the University of Houston. The Nigerian-born Olajuwon became the second foreign-born player to be drafted first overall, after Mychal Thompson from the Bahamas in 1978. The Portland Trail Blazers used the second overall pick to draft Sam Bowie from the University of Kentucky. The Chicago Bulls used the third pick to draft Naismith and Wooden College Player of the Year Michael Jordan from the University of North Carolina. Jordan went on to win the Rookie of the Year Award and was also selected to the All-NBA Second Team in his rookie season. Jordan's teammate at North Carolina, Sam Perkins, was drafted fourth by the Dallas Mavericks. Charles Barkley, a junior forward from Auburn University, was drafted fifth by the Philadelphia 76ers. Olajuwon, Jordan and Barkley, along with the 16th pick John Stockton and the 131st pick Oscar Schmidt, have been inducted to the Naismith Memorial Basketball Hall of Fame. The first four mentioned players were also named in the 50 Greatest Players in NBA History list announced at the league's 50th anniversary in 1996.

Olajuwon's achievements include two NBA championships, two Finals Most Valuable Player Awards, one Most Valuable Player Award, two Defensive Player of the Year Awards, twelve All-NBA Team selections, twelve All-Star Game selections and nine All-Defensive Team selections. Olajuwon retired as the all–time league leader in total blocked shots with 3,830 blocks.

The third pick, Jordan, achieved even greater success than Olajuwon. He won six NBA championships, six Finals Most Valuable Player Awards, five Most Valuable Player Awards, one Defensive Player of the Year Award, eleven All-NBA Team selections, fourteen All-Star Game selections, three NBA All Star Game MVP Awards, and nine All-Defensive Team selections.

Barkley and Stockton never won an NBA championship, but both players received numerous awards and honors. Barkley won the Most Valuable Player in 1993 and was selected to eleven All-NBA Teams, eleven All-Star Games, and was the MVP of the 1991 All Star Game. Stockton was selected to eleven All-NBA Teams, ten All-Star Games and five All-Defensive Teams before retiring as the all–time league leader in assists and steals and was co-MVP of the 1993 All Star Game along with his Utah Jazz teammate Karl Malone. Jordan, Barkley and Stockton would later play as teammates for the 1992 "Dream Team".

Alvin Robertson, the seventh pick, is the only other player from this draft who has won annual NBA awards as a player; he won both the Defensive Player of the Year Award and the Most Improved Player Award in 1986. He was also selected to one All-NBA Team, four All-Star Games, six consecutive All-Defensive Teams. Both Robertson and Olajuwon are among only four players in NBA history who have ever achieved the extremely rare feat of recording a quadruple double.

Two other players from this draft, ninth pick Otis Thorpe and eleventh pick Kevin Willis, were also selected to one All-Star Game each. Willis also had one selection to the All-NBA Team. Rick Carlisle, the 70th pick, became a coach after ending his playing career and won the Coach of the Year Award in 2002 while coaching the Detroit Pistons. In 2011, he coached the Dallas Mavericks to an NBA Championship.

The 1984 draft class is considered to be one of the best in NBA history as it produced five Hall of Famers and seven All-Stars. However, it was also marked by the Blazers' selection of Sam Bowie, considered one of the biggest draft busts in NBA history. It is believed that the Blazers picked Bowie over Michael Jordan because they already had an All Star shooting guard in Jim Paxson and a young shooting guard in Clyde Drexler, whom they drafted in the 1983 draft. Although Drexler went on to have a successful career, Bowie's career was cut short by injuries; he had missed two of the past three seasons in his college career as well. Despite having a 10-year career in the NBA and averaging 10.9 points and 7.5 rebounds per game, Bowie's career was interrupted by five leg surgeries, which limited him to 139 games in five years with the Blazers.

Other notable selections
Brazilian Oscar Schmidt was drafted with the 131st pick in the sixth round by the New Jersey Nets. However, Schmidt turned down the offers to play in the NBA and stayed to play in Italy and later in Brazil. He played in five Olympics and was the top scorer in three of them. He finished his career with 49,703 points with various clubs and the Brazilian national team, more than the NBA's career scoring leader, Kareem Abdul-Jabbar, who scored 38,387 points in his NBA career. In 2010, International Basketball Federation (FIBA) honored Schmidt with an induction to the FIBA Hall of Fame, and Schmidt was inducted by the Naismith Memorial Basketball Hall of Fame in 2013.

University of Houston track and field Olympic Champion Carl Lewis, who had never played college basketball, was drafted by the Chicago Bulls with the 208th pick in the 10th round. Lewis would dominate the Olympic Games in Los Angeles in the summer of 1984. Lewis, who had also been drafted in NFL draft of the same year by the Dallas Cowboys, stayed with his athletics career and went on to win nine Olympic gold medals and eight World Championships gold medals.

In the fifth round, the Portland Trail Blazers drafted Mike Whitmarsh, who starred for the University of San Diego in both basketball and volleyball, with the 111th pick. Whitmarsh played professional basketball in Germany for three years, but never played in the NBA. He then left basketball to play beach volleyball, where he achieved greater success, including a silver medal in the Olympics.

The final pick in the 1984 Draft, number 228 by the Boston Celtics, was Dan Trant of Clark University. Trant never played in a regular season game for the Celtics. Trant was working in his office at the World Trade Center on September 11, 2001 and was killed in the terrorist attacks that day.

This draft would be the last of the NBA that would be without any undrafted players entering the NBA. Starting from 1985 onward, multiple undrafted players from each year would enter the NBA, with more of them coming after the league decreased the number of rounds from the draft from 10 to the current two.

Early entrants

College underclassmen
The following college basketball players successfully applied for early draft entrance.

  Charles Barkley – F, Auburn (junior)
  Cory Blackwell – G, Wisconsin (junior)
  Stuart Gray – C, UCLA (junior)
  Michael Jordan – G, North Carolina (junior)
  Tim McCormick – C, Michigan (junior)
  Sam Norton – F, Texas–Arlington (sophomore)
  Akeem Olajuwon – C, Houston (junior)
  Yommy Sangodeyi – F, Sam Houston State (junior)
  Eric Turner – G, Michigan (junior)

Notes

See also
 List of first overall NBA draft picks

References
General

Specific

External links
NBA.com
NBA.com: NBA Draft History

Draft
National Basketball Association draft
NBA draft
NBA draft
1980s in Manhattan
Basketball in New York City
Sporting events in New York City
Sports in Manhattan
Madison Square Garden